Eight teams participated in the 2005 Women's Cricket World Cup in South Africa, the same as at the previous edition in 2000. The only change composition in was that the West Indies qualified in place of the Netherlands.

Key

Australia

England

India

Ireland

New Zealand

South Africa

Sri Lanka

West Indies

References

External links
 2005 Women's World Cup statistics, ESPNcricinfo

Women's Cricket World Cup squads
squads